OB & GY, also known as Obstetrics and Gynecology Doctors, is a 2010 South Korean medical drama television series. It aired on Seoul Broadcasting System on Wednesdays to Thursdays at 21:55 for 16 episodes beginning February 3, 2010.
The drama depicts the difficult decisions and moving human stories that take place daily in the OB-GYN department, focusing in particular on Seo Hye Young, a talented and determined obstetrician who has just transferred from the prestigious Seoul base to the branch hospital. Her straightforward manner of handling her professional life is in contrast with her love life, which is marred by her relationship with a married man. This becomes even more entangled when she meets Lee Sang Shik, the chief of NICU, and her long-time friend Wang Jae Suk also shows his interest.

Cast

Hospital Staff
 Jang Seo-hee as Seo Hye Young
 Go Joo-won as Lee Sang Shik
 Seo Ji-seok as Wang Jae Suk
 Lee Young-eun as Kim Young Mi
 Song Joong-ki as Ahn Kyung Woo
 Ahn Sun-young as Head Nurse Lee Sook Jung
 Yun Woon-kyung as Center Director
 Lee Ki-young as Assistant Chief Oh Jae Ho
 Lee Seung-hyung as Jung Kyung Joo
 Ji Yoo as Nurse Cha Young Ah
 Kim Ho-chang as Tae Joon

Others
 Jung Ho-bin as Yoon Seo Jin
 Yang Hee-kyung as Hye Young's mother
 Min Ji-young as Joo Young (Hye Young's sister)
 Choi Joon-yong as Sang Shik's brother
 Cha Hyun-jung as Jung Yoo Sun
 Lee Seul-bi as Im Seung Min
 Kim Hyun-ah as Min Young Joo
 Heo Joon-suk

Cameos
 Hyun Young as Lee Yoon Jin (ep1-2)
 Lee Eui-jung as Yeon Im (ep1-2)
 Park Jae-hoon as twins' dad (ep2, 5)
 Han Yeo-woon as Soo Jin (ep3)
 Ji Il-joo as Soo Jin's boyfriend (ep3)
 Hwang Hyo-eun as Soon Hwa (ep3)
 Kim Mi-ryeo as Moon Young (ep3)
 Wi Yang-ho as Moon Young's husband (ep3)
 Kang Ki-hwa as Joon Hee (ep4)
 Sung Ji-roo as Joon Suk (ep4-5)
 Kim Hye-ji as Sang Mi (ep5)
 Bang Joon-seo as Soo Bin (ep6-7)
 Park Bodre as Teacher Park Min Jung (ep8, 11)
 Hwang In-young as Jung Eun Mi (ep9)
 Lee Il-hwa as Lee Jung Joo (ep9)
 Kim Jung-nan as Kim Min Sun (ep10-11)
 Kim Mi-yeon as Jae Suk's ex (ep11-12)
 Jin Ye-sol as Kang Soo Ah (ep12)
 Geum Dan-bi as Min Soo Young (ep12-13)
 Ban Min-jung
 Im Seung-dae
 Lee Yun-kyung
 Song Seung-yong
 Ji Seung-hyun

References

External links
 

2010 South Korean television series debuts
2010 South Korean television series endings
Korean-language television shows
Seoul Broadcasting System television dramas
South Korean medical television series
Television series by JS Pictures